The Crime of Laura Sarelle is a 1940 novel by the British author Marjorie Bowen, published under the pen name Joseph Shearing. The original title was simply Laura Sarelle. A Gothic story, it takes place in Ireland at the crumbling ancestral home of the Sarelles.

References

Bibliography
 Vinson, James. Twentieth-Century Romance and Gothic Writers. Macmillan, 1982.

1940 British novels
Novels set in Ireland
Novels by Marjorie Bowen
Hutchinson (publisher) books